Gemmulimitra boucheti is a species of sea snail, a marine gastropod mollusk, in the family Mitridae, the miters or miter snails.

Description
The length of the shell attains 9 mm.

Distribution
This marine species occurs in the Indian Ocean off Réunion

References

 Cernohorsky W.O. (1988) The Mitridae, Costellariidae and Nassariidae (Mollusca: Gastropoda) recently dredged at Reunion Island, Indian Ocean, with descriptions of new species. Records of the Auckland Institute and Museum 25: 75-85.

External links
  Fedosov A., Puillandre N., Herrmann M., Kantor Yu., Oliverio M., Dgebuadze P., Modica M.V. & Bouchet P. (2018). The collapse of Mitra: molecular systematics and morphology of the Mitridae (Gastropoda: Neogastropoda). Zoological Journal of the Linnean Society. 183(2): 253-337

boucheti
Gastropods described in 1988